The Sankh River flows across Jharkhand, Chhattisgarh and Odisha states in India. The river flows for  before it meets the Koel River in Odisha.

Course 
The river finally enters Odisha and travels another  before merging with the Koel. The South Koel enters Odisha and joins the Sarnkh River at Vedavyas near Rourkela from where it is called the Brahmani (see ).

Sadni Falls

References 

Rivers of Chhattisgarh
Rivers of Jharkhand
Sundergarh district
Rivers of Odisha
Rivers of India